Farida El Askalany (born ) is an  Egyptian female volleyball player. She was part of the Egypt women's national volleyball team.

She played volleyball in Heliopolis club since she was 7 years old. Farida joined the Egyptian national team at the age of 12. She participated in many African and World championships. 
She won the gold medal four times in different African championships, one time in the 2011 Pan Arab Games.

References

External links

1995 births
Living people
Egyptian women's volleyball players
Competitors at the 2019 African Games
African Games competitors for Egypt
21st-century Egyptian women